The Burj Khalifa (Khalifa Tower), known as the Burj Dubai prior to its inauguration in 2010, is a skyscraper in Dubai, United Arab Emirates. It is known for being the world's tallest building.

Construction of the Burj Khalifa began in 2004, with the exterior completed five years later in 2009. The primary structure is reinforced concrete and some of the structural steel for the building originated from the Palace of the Republic in East Berlin, the former East German parliament. The building was opened in 2010 as part of a new development called Downtown Dubai. It was designed to be the centerpiece of large-scale, mixed-use development. The decision to construct the building was based on the government's decision to diversify from an oil-based economy, and for Dubai to gain international recognition. The building is named in honor of the former president of the United Arab Emirates, Khalifa bin Zayed Al Nahyan. Abu Dhabi and the UAE government lent Dubai money to pay its debts. The building broke numerous height records, including its designation as the tallest building in the world.

Burj Khalifa was designed by a team led by Adrian Smith of Skidmore, Owings & Merrill, the firm that designed the Sears Tower in Chicago, a previous record holder for the world's tallest building. Hyder Consulting was chosen to be the supervising engineer with NORR Group Consultants International Limited chosen to supervise the architecture of the project. The design is derived from the Islamic architecture of the region, such as in the Great Mosque of Samarra. The Y-shaped tripartite floor geometry is designed to optimize residential and hotel space. A buttressed central core and wings are used to support the height of the building. Although this design was derived from Tower Palace III, the Burj Khalifa's central core houses all vertical transportation except egress stairs within each of the wings. The structure also features a cladding system which is designed to withstand Dubai's hot summer temperatures. It contains a total of 57 elevators and 8 escalators.

At a certain point in the architectural and engineering process, the original Emaar developers experienced financial problems and required more money and economic funding. Sheikh Khalifa, the then-ruler of the United Arab Emirates, granted monetary aid and funding, hence the changing of the name from "Burj Dubai" to "Burj Khalifa". The concept of profitability derived from building high-density developments and malls around the landmark has proven successful. Its surrounding malls, hotels, and condominiums in Downtown Dubai have generated the most revenue from the project as a whole, while the Burj Khalifa itself made little or no profit.

The critical reception of Burj Khalifa has been generally positive, and the building has received many awards. Numerous complaints concern migrant workers from South Asia, the primary building labour force, who were paid low wages and sometimes had their passports confiscated.

Development 
Construction began on 12 January 2004, with the exterior of the structure completed on 1 October 2009. The building officially opened on 4 January 2010 and is part of the  Downtown Dubai development at the 'First Interchange' along Sheikh Zayed Road, near Dubai's main business district. The tower's architecture and engineering were performed by Skidmore, Owings & Merrill of Chicago, with Adrian Smith as chief architect, and Bill Baker as a chief structural engineer. The primary contractor was Samsung C&T of South Korea, together with local company Arabtec and the Belgian group BESIX.

Conception 
Burj Khalifa was designed to be the centerpiece of a large-scale, mixed-use development to include 30,000 homes, nine hotels (including The Address Downtown Dubai),  of parkland, at least 19 residential skyscrapers, the Dubai Mall, and the  artificial Burj Khalifa Lake. The decision to build Burj Khalifa was reportedly based on the government's decision to diversify from an oil-based economy to one that is service and tourism based. According to officials, projects like Burj Khalifa needed to be built to garner more international recognition and hence investment. "He (Sheikh Mohammed bin Rashid Al Maktoum) wanted to put Dubai on the map with something really sensational," said Jacqui Josephson, a tourism and VIP delegations executive at Nakheel Properties. The tower was known as Burj Dubai ("Dubai Tower") until its official opening in January 2010. It was renamed in honour of the ruler of Abu Dhabi, Khalifa bin Zayed Al Nahyan; Abu Dhabi and the federal government of UAE lent Dubai tens of billions of US dollars so that Dubai could pay its debts – Dubai borrowed at least $80 billion for construction projects. In the 2000s, Dubai started diversifying its economy but it suffered from an economic crisis in 2007–2010, leaving large-scale projects already in construction abandoned.

Records 
The Burj Khalifa set several world records, including:
Tallest existing structure:  (previously KVLY-TV mast – )
 Tallest structure ever built:  (previously Warsaw radio mast – )
 Tallest freestanding structure:  (previously CN Tower – )
 Tallest skyscraper (to top of spire):  (previously Taipei 101 – )
 Tallest skyscraper to top of antenna:  (previously the Willis (formerly Sears) Tower – )
 Building with most floors: 163 (previously World Trade Center – 110)
 World's highest elevator installation (situated inside a rod at the very top of the building)
 World's longest travel distance elevators: 
 Highest vertical concrete pumping (for a building): 
World's tallest structure that includes residential space
 World's highest installation of an aluminium and glass façade: 
 World's highest nightclub: 144th floor
 World's highest New Year display of fireworks.
 World's largest light and sound show staged on a single building.

Architecture and design 

The tower was designed by Skidmore, Owings, and Merrill (SOM), which also designed the Willis Tower (formerly the Sears Tower) in Chicago and the One World Trade Center in New York City. Burj Khalifa uses the bundled tube design of the Willis Tower, invented by Fazlur Rahman Khan. Due to its tubular system, proportionally only half the amount of steel was used in the construction, compared to the Empire State Building. Khan's contributions to the design of tall buildings have had a profound impact on architecture and engineering. It would be difficult to find any worldwide practices in the design of tall buildings that have not been directly or indirectly influenced by his work. The design is reminiscent of Frank Lloyd Wright's vision for The Illinois, a mile-high skyscraper designed for Chicago, as well as Chicago's Lake Point Tower. When Adrian Smith was conceiving the project at SOM, he looked out his office window toward Lake Point Tower's curved three-wing layout and thought, "There's the prototype". According to Strabala, Burj Khalifa was designed based on the 73 floor Tower Palace Three, an all-residential building in Seoul. In its early planning, Burj Khalifa was intended to be entirely residential.

After the original design by Skidmore, Owings, and Merrill, Emaar Properties chose Hyder Consulting to be the supervising engineer and NORR Group Consultants International Ltd to supervise the architecture of the project. Hyder was selected for their expertise in structural and MEP (mechanical, electrical and plumbing) engineering. Hyder Consulting's role was to supervise construction, certify the architect's design, and be the engineer and architect of record to the UAE authorities. NORR's role was the supervision of all architectural components including on-site supervision during the construction and design of a 6-story addition to the office annex building for architectural documentation. NORR was also responsible for the architectural integration drawings for the Armani Hotel included in the Tower. Emaar Properties also engaged GHD, an international multidisciplinary consulting firm, to act as an independent verification and testing authority for concrete and steelwork.

The design is derived from Islamic architecture. As the tower rises from the flat desert base, there are 27 setbacks in a spiral pattern, decreasing the cross-section of the tower as it rises and creating convenient outdoor terraces. These setbacks are arranged and aligned in a way that minimizes vibration wind loading from eddy currents and vortices. At the top, the central core emerges and is sculpted to form a finishing spire.

The spire also houses communications equipment. This  spire is widely considered vanity height, since very little of its space is usable. This was reported in a Council on Tall Buildings and Urban Habitat study, which notes that the empty spire "could be a skyscraper on its own". Such a skyscraper, if located in Europe, would be the 11th tallest building on that continent.

In 2009 architects announced that more than 1,000 pieces of art would adorn the interiors of Burj Khalifa, while the residential lobby of Burj Khalifa would display the work of Jaume Plensa.

The architectural glass provides solar and thermal performance as well as an anti-glare shield for the intense desert sun, extreme desert temperatures and strong winds.

The exterior temperature at the top of the building is thought to be 6 °C (11 °F) cooler than at its base.

A 304-room Armani Hotel, the first of four by Armani, occupies 15 of the lower 39 floors. The hotel was supposed to open on 18 March 2010, but after several delays, it finally opened to the public on 27 April 2010. The corporate suites and offices were also supposed to open from March onwards, yet the hotel and observation deck remained the only parts of the building which were open in April 2010.

The sky lobbies on the 43rd and 76th floors house swimming pools. Floors 20 through 108 have 900 private residential apartments (which, according to the developer, sold out within eight hours of being on the market). An outdoor zero-entry swimming pool is located on the 76th floor of the tower. Corporate offices and suites fill most of the remaining floors, except for the 122nd, 123rd, and 124th, where the At.mosphere restaurant, sky lobby, and an indoor and outdoor observation deck are located respectively. In January 2010, it was planned that Burj Khalifa would receive its first residents in February 2010.

The building has 57 elevators and 8 escalators. Engineers initially considered installing the world's first triple-deck elevators. The double-deckers are equipped with LCD displays to amuse visitors during their travel to the observation deck. The building has 2,909 stairs from the ground floor to the 160th floor.

Plumbing systems 
An additional  of piping serves the fire emergency system, and  supplies chilled water for the air conditioning system.

Air conditioning 
The air conditioning system draws air from the upper floors where the air is cooler and cleaner than on the ground. Water is collected via a condensate collection system and is used to irrigate the nearby park.

Window cleaning 
To wash the 24,348 windows, totaling  of glass, the building has three horizontal tracks, each holding a  bucket machine. Above level 109, and up to tier 27, traditional cradles from davits are used. The top of the building is cleaned by a crew that uses ropes to descend from the top to gain access. Under normal conditions, when all building maintenance units are operational, it takes 36 workers three to four months to clean the entire exterior.

Unmanned machines clean the top 27 additional tiers and the glass spire. The cleaning system was developed in Melbourne, Australia, by CoxGomyl, a manufacturer of building maintenance units, at a cost of A$8 million.

Features

Fountain 

Outside the Burj Khalifa, WET Enterprises designed a fountain system at a cost of Dh 800 million (US$217 million). It is the world's largest choreographed fountain. On 26 October 2008, Emaar announced that based on results of a naming contest the fountain would be called the Dubai Fountain.

Observation deck 

An outdoor observation deck, named At the Top, opened on 5 January 2010 on the 124th floor. At , it was the highest outdoor observation deck in the world when it opened. The 124th floor observation deck also features the electronic telescope, an augmented reality device developed by Gsmprjct° of Montréal, which allows visitors to view the surrounding landscape in real-time, and to view previously saved images such as those taken at different times of day or under different weather conditions. To reduce the daily rush of sightseers, management allows visitors to purchase tickets in advance for a specific date and time, at a 75% discount on tickets purchased on the spot.

On 8 February 2010, the observation deck was closed to the public for two months after power-supply problems caused an elevator to become stuck between floors, trapping a group of tourists for 45 minutes.

Park 
Burj Khalifa is surrounded by an  park designed by landscape architects SWA Group. Like the tower, the park's design was based on the flower of the Hymenocallis, a desert plant. At the centre of the park is the water room, which is a series of pools and water jet fountains. Benches and signs incorporate images of Burj Khalifa and the Hymenocallis flower.

The plants are watered by water collected from the building's cooling system. The system provides  annually. WET Enterprises, who also developed the Dubai Fountain, developed the park's six water features.

Floor plan

Ramadan observance 
On the higher floors, the sun is seen for several minutes after it seems to have set at ground level. Those living above the 80th floor should wait two extra minutes to break their Ramadan fast, and those living above the 150th floor should wait three minutes.

Construction 

The tower was constructed by Samsung C&T from South Korea, which also did work on the Petronas Twin Towers and Taipei 101. Samsung C&T built the tower in a joint venture with BESIX from Belgium and Arabtec from the UAE. Turner was the project manager on the main construction contract. Hong Kong-based Far East Aluminum combined to provide the exterior cladding for Burj Khalifa.

The contractor and the engineer of record was Hyder Consulting. Under UAE law, the contractor and the engineer of record is jointly and severally liable for the performance of Burj Khalifa.

The primary structure is reinforced concrete. Putzmeister created a new, super high-pressure trailer concrete pump, the BSA 14000 SHP-D, for this project. Three tower cranes were used during the construction of the uppermost levels, each capable of lifting a 25-tonne load. The remaining structure above was constructed of lighter steel.

In 2003, 33 test holes were drilled to study the strength of the bedrock underlying the structure. "Weak to very weak sandstone and siltstone" was found, just metres below the surface. Samples were taken from test holes drilled to a depth of 140 metres, finding weak to very weak rock all the way. The study described the site as part of a "seismically active area". Another challenging element was the shamal which often creates sandstorms.

This weight was then divided by the compressive strength of concrete which is 30 MPa which yielded 450 sq. meters of vertical normal effective area, which then yielded 12 meters by 12 meters dimensions. A cathodic protection system is under the concrete to neutralize the sulphate and chloride-rich groundwater and prevent corrosion.

During the construction of the Burj Khalifa, over 35,000 tonnes of structural steel which held the Palace of the Republic, the former parliament building of the German Democratic Republic, the Volkskammer, in East Berlin together were shipped to Dubai in 2008.

The Burj Khalifa is highly compartmentalised. Pressurized, air-conditioned refuge floors are located every 13 floors (on floors G, 13, 26, 39, 52, etc.) where people can shelter on their long walk down to safety in case of an emergency or fire.

Special mixes of concrete were made to withstand the extreme pressures of the massive building weight; as is typical with reinforced concrete construction, each batch of concrete was tested to ensure it could withstand certain pressures. CTLGroup, working for Skidmore, Owings and Merrill, conducted the creep and shrinkage testing critical for the structural analysis of the building.

The consistency of the concrete used in the project was essential. It was difficult to create a concrete that could withstand both the thousands of tonnes bearing down on it and Persian Gulf temperatures that can reach . To combat this problem, the concrete was not poured during the day. Instead, during the summer months, ice was added to the mixture and it was poured at night when the air was cooler and the humidity was higher. Cooler concrete cures more evenly and is, therefore, less likely to set too quickly and crack. Any significant cracks could have put the entire project in jeopardy.

Milestones 

 January 2004: Excavation commences.
 February 2004: Piling starts.
 21 September 2004: Emaar contractors begin construction.
 March 2005: Structure of Burj Khalifa starts rising.
 June 2006: Level 50 is reached.
 February 2007: Surpasses the Sears Tower as the building with the most floors.
 21 July 2007: Surpasses Taipei 101, whose height of  made it the world's tallest building, and level 141 reached.
 12 August 2007: Surpasses the Sears Tower antenna, which stands .
 12 September 2007: At , becomes the world's tallest freestanding structure, surpassing the CN Tower in Toronto, and level 150 reached.
 7 April 2008: At , surpasses the KVLY-TV Mast to become the tallest human-made structure, level 160 reached.
 1 September 2008: Height tops , making it the tallest human-made structure ever built, surpassing the previous record-holder, the Warsaw Radio Mast in Konstantynów, Poland.
 1 October 2009: Emaar announces that the exterior of the building is completed.
 4 January 2010: Burj Khalifa's official launch ceremony is held and Burj Khalifa is opened. Burj Dubai was renamed Burj Khalifa in honour of the President of the UAE and ruler of Abu Dhabi, Sheikh Khalifa bin Zayed al Nahyan.
 10 March 2010: Council on Tall Buildings and Urban Habitat certifies Burj Khalifa as world's tallest building.

Real estate values 
In March 2009, Mohamed Ali Alabbar, chairman of the project's developer, Emaar Properties, said office space pricing at Burj Khalifa reached US$4,000 per sq ft (over US$43,000 per m2) and the Armani Residences, also in Burj Khalifa, sold for US$3,500 per sq ft (over US$37,500 per m2). He estimated the total cost for the project to be about US$1.5 billion.

The project's completion coincided with the financial crisis of 2007–2008, and with vast overbuilding in the country, leading to high vacancies and foreclosures. With Dubai mired in debt from its huge ambitions, the government was forced to seek multibillion-dollar bailouts from its oil-rich neighbor Abu Dhabi. Subsequently, in a surprise move at its opening ceremony, the tower was renamed Burj Khalifa, said to honour the UAE President Khalifa bin Zayed Al Nahyan for his crucial support.

Because of the slumping demand in Dubai's property market, the rents in the Burj Khalifa plummeted 40% some ten months after its opening. Out of 900 apartments in the tower, 825 were still empty at that time. Over the next 30 months, overseas investors steadily bought up available apartments and office space. By October 2012, Emaar reported that around 80% of the apartments were occupied.

Official launch ceremony 

The ceremony was broadcast live on a giant screen on Burj Park Island and on smaller screens elsewhere. Hundreds of media outlets from around the world reported live from the scene. In addition to the media presence, 6,000 guests were expected.

The opening was held on 4 January 2010. The ceremony featured a display of 10,000 fireworks, light beams projected on and around the tower, and further sound, light and water effects. The celebratory lighting was designed by UK lighting designers Speirs and Major Associates. Using the 868 powerful stroboscope lights that are integrated into the façade and spire of the tower, different lighting sequences were choreographed, together with more than 50 different combinations of other effects.

Controversies

Death 
On 10 May 2011, an Asian worker in his mid-30s jumped to his death from the 147th floor onto the 108th floor's deck. Dubai police said he killed himself because his company refused to let him leave.

On 18 May 2015, Dubai police disputed a report that a Portuguese tourist fell to her death from the Burj Khalifa the prior November 16, saying she fell from Jumeirah Lakes Towers. Emails obtained by Nine News from Portugal's embassy in the UAE indicated she jumped from the 148th floor of the Burj Khalifa.

Labour 

The Burj Khalifa was built primarily by workers from South Asia and East Asia. This is generally because the current generation of UAE locals prefer governmental jobs and do not have an attitude favouring private sector employment. On 17 June 2008, there were about 7,500 skilled workers employed at the construction site. Press reports indicated in 2006 that skilled carpenters at the site earned £4.34 a day, and labourers earned £2.84. According to a BBC investigation and a Human Rights Watch report, the workers were housed in abysmal conditions, and worked long hours for low pay. During construction, only one construction-related death was reported. Workplace injuries and deaths in the UAE are poorly documented, according to Human Rights Watch.

In March 2006 about 2,500 workers, upset over buses that were delayed for the end of their shifts, protested and triggered a riot, damaging cars, offices, computers, and construction equipment. A Dubai Interior Ministry official said the rioters caused almost £500,000 in damage. Most of the workers involved in the riot returned the following day but refused to work.

New Year's Eve 
Emaar New Year's Eve is an annual event held every 31 December at Burj Khalifa, the World's tallest building in Dubai, the United Arab Emirates, organized by Emaar.

Emaar New Year's Eve has won two Guinness World Records, including 'Largest LED-Illuminated Facade' in 2015 and 2019.

In 2021, Emaar celebrated togetherness in honor of frontline workers of the COVID-19 pandemic.

The Emaar New Year's Eve fireworks celebration originated in 2010 with the inauguration of the world's tallest building, Burj Khalifa. The celebration was broadcast live to more than two million people and lasted for three minutes. An accompanying sound and light show was choreographed by The Dubai Fountain.

Since 2011, national live broadcasting rights have been held by Dubai Media Incorporated and Dubai TV.

In 2017 and 2018, Emaar New Year's Eve was broadcast live on Twitter, and YouTube. In 2020, it was broadcast live for the first time on Zoom.

BASE jumping 
The building has been used by several experienced BASE jumpers for authorised and unauthorised BASE jumping:

Climbing 
On 28 March 2011, Alain "Spiderman" Robert scaled the outside of Burj Khalifa. The climb to the top of the spire took six hours. To comply with UAE safety laws, Robert, who usually climbs in free solo style, used a rope and harness.

Awards 
In June 2010, Burj Khalifa was the recipient of the 2010 "Best Tall Building Middle East & Africa" award by the Council on Tall Buildings and Urban Habitat. On 28 September 2010 Burj Khalifa won the award for the best project of the year at the Middle East Architect Awards 2010. Awards Chair Gordon Gill, of Adrian Smith + Gordon Gill Architecture, said:

Burj Khalifa was also the recipient of the following awards.

See also 

 List of buildings in Dubai
 List of buildings with 100 floors or more
 List of development projects in Dubai
 List of tallest buildings and structures
 List of tallest freestanding structures
 List of tallest buildings in Dubai
 List of tallest buildings in the United Arab Emirates
 List of tallest buildings
 List of tallest structures
 Jeddah Tower

References

External links 

 
  (597 KB) (Structure magazine, June 2006)
  (620 KB) (Irwin et al., November 2006)
 BBC reports: Burj Khalifa opening, with video and links; Maintaining the world's tallest building
 

Articles containing video clips
High-tech architecture
Hotel buildings completed in 2009
Islamic architecture
Neo-futurism architecture
Office buildings completed in 2009
Postmodern architecture in Dubai
Residential buildings completed in 2009
Residential skyscrapers in Dubai
Skidmore, Owings & Merrill buildings
Skyscraper hotels in Dubai
Skyscraper office buildings in Dubai
2009 establishments in the United Arab Emirates